Hamburg (1895–1915) was an American Thoroughbred race horse. The leading American colt of his generation, Hamburg was retrospectively named the American Horse of the Year for 1898. After his racing career he went on to be a successful sire.

Background
Hamburg was bred in Kentucky by Cornelius J. Enright at his Elmendorf Farm. Hamburg's sire was the great Hanover by another great, Hindoo. Hamburg's dam Lady Reel was descended from Gallopade, a British broodmare who was exported to Canada in the 1830s and became the female-line ancestor of numerous major winners in North America. Enright had acquired Lady Reel from James E. Kittson, brother to Norman W. Kittson who had been partners in Erdenheim Stud.

In 1897, Hamburg was purchased for $1,200 by the Hall of Fame trainer John E. Madden who raced him as a two-year-old.  Madden said he was the hardest colt he'd ever trained.  But once "tamed," he was quick to exercise and very eager to eat.

Racing career
At two, Hamburg carried 129 pounds in the Double Event, Flash, and Autumn Stakes, 132 in the Electric Handicap, 134 pounds in the Congress Hall, and in the Great Eastern, he was loaded with 135 pounds.  Some of his better rivals carried almost as much, but these weights were, and remain, very high, especially for a juvenile horse.  On the Hall of Fame site, it states that Hamburg “carried the highest weights ever by a juvenile.”

Hamburg was so eager to race, his rapid breaks often caused the official starter's ability to be questioned.  Tod Sloan, the Hall of Fame jockey who rode him and hundreds of other horses, many of whom were highly regarded, said, "Hamburg was the only great horse I ever rode."

In December 1897, Madden sold Hamburg for $40,000 to Marcus Daly, the copper magnate, who turned him over to his trainer, Billy Lakeland. (Even so, Madden thought so much of Hamburg, he named his farm in Lexington, Kentucky Hamburg Place after him.)  Marcus Daly, one of three men called the Copper Kings, maintained the Bitter Root Stock Farm in Hamilton, Montana but kept Hamburg in the East at his trainers facilities. At age three, Hamburg won for Daly as he'd won for Madden.  In the Realization Stakes, he beat Plaudit, the winner of the 1898 Kentucky Derby. In the Brighton Cup, he bested the Brooklyn and Parkway Stakes winner, Howard Mann.

Retirement

When owner Marcus Daly died in 1900, his horses were sold, with Hamburg bringing the highest price: $60,000.  William Collins Whitney bought him for stud duty.  W. C. Whitney died in 1904 at which point Hamburg was then auctioned, and bought for $70,000 by his son, Harry Payne Whitney.

Hamburg was the Leading sire in North America in 1905.  He produced at least 27 stakes winners, including Artful, Dandelion, Burgomaster (out of the mare Hurley Burley), Pegasus, Frizette, and Borrow.  He was the damsire of Regret, the first filly to win the Kentucky Derby and of another great filly, Maskette.

Hamburg was inducted into the Hall of Fame in 1986.

Hamburg died in New Jersey on September 10, 1915.

Charles Cary Rumsey, an American sculptor and polo playing friend, was commissioned by Harry Whitney to create a sculpture of Hamburg.

Pedigree

Hamburg was inbred 2 × 4 to Vandal and Lexington meaning that each of these stallions appear twice in the fourth generation of his pedigree.

Sire line tree

Hamburg
Inflexible
Textile
Pluvious
Strephon
Dandelion
Battleaxe
Burgomaster
Bourgeois
Burgoright
Glasgow
Sebastolbol
Portugal
Orison
The Irishman
Baby Wolf
Hillside
Borrow
Buskin
Prince Eugene
Happy Go Lucky

References

 Robertson, William H.P. The History of Thoroughbred Racing in America Bonanza Press, New York, 1964
 Champions, The Lives, Times, and Past Performances of America's Greatest Thoroughbreds, Revised Edition, Champions from 1893-2004, the Daily Racing Form

1895 racehorse births
1915 racehorse deaths
Racehorses bred in Kentucky
Racehorses trained in the United States
American Thoroughbred Horse of the Year
United States Champion Thoroughbred Sires
United States Thoroughbred Racing Hall of Fame inductees
Thoroughbred family 23-b
Byerley Turk sire line